"I'd Love to Lay You Down" is a song written by Johnny MacRae, and recorded by American country music artist Conway Twitty.  It was released in January 1980 as the first single from the album Heart & Soul.  The song was Twitty's 24th number one on the country chart.  The single stayed at number one for one week.  The song has sold 300,000 digital copies since becoming available for download.

In 2002, Daryle Singletary released a remake, which went to number 43 on the same chart.

Conway's version of this song features an extremely unusual series of key changes:  the song progressively lowers in key instead of the musical standard of changing keys upwards.

Chris Young references this song in his single "I Can Take It from There".

Chart performance

Conway Twitty

Year-end charts

Daryle Singletary

Certifications

References

1980 singles
2002 singles
Daryle Singletary songs
Conway Twitty songs
MCA Records singles
Songs written by Johnny MacRae
1980 songs